Balls to Picasso is the second solo album by Iron Maiden vocalist Bruce Dickinson, released in 1994. It is the first album in Dickinson's solo career that was released after he had officially left Iron Maiden (although he rejoined again in 1999).

This record marked the beginning of Dickinson's collaborations with guitarist Roy Z, who would work on many of Dickinson's later albums including Accident of Birth, The Chemical Wedding and Tyranny of Souls. Stylistically it departs from Tattooed Millionaire but is still more traditional-sounding than the follow-up album Skunkworks released in 1996. Later, Dickinson said that he and Roy Z were talked into making the album less heavy than it should have been.

Overview
Dickinson started working on his second solo album while still in Iron Maiden. For the very first recording sessions he recruited the British band Skin. Not satisfied with the style of the effort, Dickinson aborted the recording. His next attempt at a second solo album was a collaboration with producer Keith Olsen. "Over and Out", "Tibet", "Tears of the Dragon (First Bit, Long Bit, Last Bit)", "Cadillac Gas Mask", and "No Way Out...Continued" are all songs recorded with Olsen and set for inclusion on the second, aborted version of Balls to Picasso, also referred to by insiders as "The Peter Gabriel Album". Other songs from these sessions that have yet to surface on any Dickinson release include "Man of Sorrows" (re-recorded for Accident of Birth; an older demo version from 1990 appears on The Best of Bruce Dickinson), "Original Sin" and "Thank Heaven".

Dickinson decided to scrap this project as well and teamed up with guitarist Roy Z and his band Tribe of Gypsies to write and record Balls to Picasso. The song "Change of Heart" was originally written and demoed by Roy Z and vocalist Rob Rock with their band Driver. Dickinson changed the lyrics for the version that was recorded for Balls to Picasso.  Z and Rock finally recorded and released their version when Driver reunited for their 2008 debut album, Sons of Thunder. Songs from the previous recording sessions later resurfaced as b-sides on singles from Balls to Picasso and subsequently also as bonus tracks on the album's 2005 extended edition.

In the Anthology DVD, Dickinson said that he regrets not naming the album Laughing in the Hiding Bush after the song of the same name. The song itself is dedicated to his son, Austin, who penned the title.

Balls to Picasso was also released in DVD-Audio 5.1 mix and DualDisc (CD/DVD-Audio 5.1 mix) versions by Sanctuary Records.

Cover artwork
In a 1996 interview with Tom Russell of Glasgow-based Radio Clyde 1, Bruce revealed that the album was originally to be titled Laughing in the Hiding Bush. The artwork was designed by Storm Thorgerson – but they couldn't afford it. His album's title was changed and he drew two squares on a toilet wall for the cover, and Thorgerson's artwork later ended up as the cover for the Anthrax album Stomp 442.

Thorgerson later did the artwork for Bruce's Skunkworks album.

Track listing

Personnel 
 Bruce Dickinson – vocals

Tribe of Gypsies 
 Roy Z – guitar
 Eddie Casillas – bass guitar
 David Ingraham – drums
 Doug Van Booven – percussion
 Dean Ortega – vocals
 Mario Aguilar – percussion  on "Shoot All the Clowns"

Additional musicians
 Dickie Fliszar – drums on "Tears of the Dragon"
 Richard Baker – keyboards and programming

Production
Shay Baby – producer, mixing
Spencer May – additional engineering
Sean De Feo – engineer at Townhouse 3
Andy Baker – engineer at Westside Studios
Bjorn Thorsrud – engineer on "Shoot All the Clowns 
Greg Fulginiti & Andy Van Dette – mastering at Masterdisk, New York

Charts

Album

Singles

Tears of the Dragon

Shoot All the Clowns

References 

Bruce Dickinson albums
1994 albums
Mercury Records albums
EMI Records albums